Two steamships operated by Irish Shipping were named Irish Hazel
 , under repair 1941–43, requisitioned by the United Kingdom, returned 1945 and in service until 1949
 , in service 1950–60

Ship names